This is a list of number-one hits by British artists in the United States on the Billboard Hot 100 chart (existent since August 3, 1958). The only British artist to have a pre-Hot 100 number one was Vera Lynn, with "Auf Wiederseh'n Sweetheart" holding the top spot for nine weeks starting from July 12, 1952.

With 20 number-one singles, the current most successful British act on the Billboard Hot 100 is the Beatles. They are followed by George Michael who had ten number 1 singles on the chart (including his duets with Aretha Franklin and Elton John, plus the ones scored with the band Wham!). The Bee Gees and Elton John have nine number-one singles each. The Rolling Stones have had eight number one singles. Sir Paul McCartney is a credited artist on seven US  1s - two more No. 1s are credited to Wings alone.<ref>Bronson, F. (2003) The Billboard Book of Number 1 Hits" Billboard Books. p. 936</ref> Adele and Dame Olivia Newton-John rank as the most successful female artists, with five number-one singles each, although Newton-John moved to Australia at the age of six.

Bananarama and the Spice Girls are the only British girl groups to score a number one on the Hot 100. With "Viva la Vida", Coldplay were the first British group to reach number-one in the 21st century. In 2021, they became the first British group in history to debut at the top of Billboard'' Hot 100 with "My Universe". The band were also the only British group with number-one singles in the 21st century until Glass Animals topped the chart with "Heat Waves".

List of number ones
 N/A represents a single that was not released in the UK, or failed to chart.
 £ represents a single that sold over 1 million copies in the UK.

See also
List of Billboard Hot 100 number-ones by Australian artists
List of Billboard Hot 100 number-ones by Canadian artists
List of Billboard Hot 100 number-ones by European artists
British Invasion
British soul

Notes

 Billy Preston was American. The Beatles are British.
 The Bee Gees were born on the Isle of Man, a Crown dependency that is not part of the UK, and moved to the UK proper in their early childhood, but moved to Australia later in their childhood and resided there for eight years before moving back to the UK.
 Linda McCartney was American. It is unknown whether she chose to become a British national too.
 America members formed their band in England and moved to the United States shortly after their fame; their members are children of American servicemen stationed there and have dual UK/US citizenship, 2 of whom were American-born.
 Mick Fleetwood, John McVie and Christine McVie are British, Stevie Nicks and Lindsey Buckingham are American.
 Andy Gibb was the brother of the Bee Gees. He was born in the UK proper, but moved with the rest of his family to Australia as an infant, grew up mainly in Australia, and lived in the US for most of his recording career.
 Olivia Newton-John was a British Australian. Travolta is American.
 Like Newton-John, Graham Russell of Air Supply was born in Britain, but is now an Australian citizen, while Russell Hitchcock is Australian.
 Paul McCartney is British, Stevie Wonder is American.
 Joe Cocker was British, Jennifer Warnes is American.
 The Police were Britons Sting and Andy Summers, and American Stewart Copeland, whose mother was Scottish.
 Paul McCartney is British, Michael Jackson was American.
 Mick Jones, Ian McDonald (founding members) and Dennis Elliott are British, Lou Gramm, Al Greenwood and Ed Gagliardi are American.
 Phil Collins is British, Marilyn Martin is American.
 Dionne and Friends are Americans Dionne Warwick, Stevie Wonder and Gladys Knight, and Briton Elton John.
 George Michael was British, Aretha Franklin was American.
 Rod Stewart and Sting are British, Bryan Adams is Canadian and his parents were English-born.
 Jay Sean is British, Lil Wayne is American.
 Taio Cruz is British, Ludacris is American.
 Lauren Bennett is British and a featured artist, LMFAO and GoonRock are American.
 Calvin Harris is British and a featured artist, Rihanna is Barbadian.
 Iggy Azalea was born in Australia, but now lives in the United States, while Charli XCX is British.
 Mark Ronson is British, Bruno Mars is American.
 Kyla is British and a featured artist, Drake is Canadian, and Wizkid is Nigerian.
 21 Savage is British and a featured artist, but now lives in the United States. Post Malone is American.
 Ed Sheeran is British, Beyoncé is American.
 M.I.A. is British and a featured artist, Travis Scott and Young Thug are American.
 Coldplay are British, BTS are South Korean.
 21 Savage is British and a featured artist, but now lives in the United States. Drake is Canadian.
 Sam Smith is British, Kim Petras is German.

References

British artists
British music-related lists